The following television stations operate on virtual channel 5 in the United States:

 K02JO-D in Caliente, Nevada
 K03HD-D in Plevna, Montana
 K03IW-D in Cedar Canyon, Utah
 K04HH-D in Aspen, Colorado
 K04RU-D in Long Valley Junction, Utah
 K05AR-D in Rockville, Utah
 K05GA-D in Dolores, Colorado
 K05JW-D in Ismay Canyon, Colorado
 K05KK-D in Poplar, Montana
 K05LI-D in Weber Canyon, Colorado
 K05MR-D in Bullhead City, Arizona
 K07CG-D in Toquerville, Utah
 K07ED-D in Enterprise, Utah
 K07HS-D in Williams, Oregon
 K07IC-D in Malta, Montana
 K07JT-D in Brookings, Oregon
 K07KF-D in Thomasville, Colorado
 K07PZ-D in Cave Junction, Oregon
 K07VA-D in Jordan, Montana
 K08AK-D in Port Orford, etc, Oregon
 K08BO-D in Virgin, Utah
 K08EN-D in Pine Valley, etc., Utah
 K08QG-D in Helper, Utah
 K09BE-D in Ekalaka, Montana
 K09BX-D in Saco, Montana
 K09ZP-D in Sigurd & Salina, Utah
 K09ZQ-D in Marysvale, Utah
 K09ZR-D in Woodland & Kamas, Utah
 K09ZU-D in East Price, Utah
 K09ZW-D in Roosevelt, etc., Utah
 K10BK-D in Big Sandy, Montana
 K10HO-D in Big Piney, etc., Wyoming
 K10RB-D in Mesa, Colorado
 K10RC-D in Denton, Montana
 K11ED-D in Ruth, Nevada
 K11EE-D in Ely & McGill, Nevada
 K11OW-D in Ursine, Nevada
 K11QQ-D in Hildale, etc., Utah
 K12DE-D in Lund & Preston, Nevada
 K12GP-D in Dodson, Montana
 K12MI-D in Laketown, etc., Utah
 K13CP-D in Cedar City, Utah
 K13DU-D in Whitewater, Montana
 K13HA-D in Mink Creek, Idaho
 K13HU-D in Fort Jones, etc., California
 K13IG-D in Sidney-Fairview, Montana
 K13LN-D in Ekalaka, Montana
 K13MA-D in Scobey, Montana
 K13MI-D in Squaw Valley, etc., Oregon
 K13PU-D in Pioche, Nevada
 K13QY-D in Dingle, etc., Idaho
 K14AG-D in Circle, etc., Montana
 K14KD-D in Frost, Minnesota
 K14KE-D in St. James, Minnesota
 K14NU-D in Beowawe, Nevada
 K14RG-D in Circleville, Utah
 K15AL-D in Winnemucca, Nevada
 K15EE-D in Elko, Nevada
 K15FV-D in Red River, New Mexico
 K15HC-D in Quemado/Pie Town, New Mexico
 K15HD-D in Taos, New Mexico
 K15JO-D in Chama, New Mexico
 K15JV-D in Mexican Hat, Utah
 K15LG-D in Hawthorne, Nevada
 K15LR-D in Meadview, Arizona
 K15LU-D in Eureka, Nevada
 K15LY-D in Ruth, Nevada
 K16CO-D in Alexandria, Minnesota
 K16FV-D in Ryndon, Nevada
 K16GP-D in Circle, Montana
 K16LF-D in Eads, etc., Colorado
 K16MC-D in Rural Sevier County, Utah
 K16MD-D in Teasdale/Torrey, Utah
 K16ME-D in Richfield, etc., Utah
 K16MF-D in Koosharem, Utah
 K16MG-D in Panguitch, Utah
 K16MH-D in Henrieville, Utah
 K16NA-D in Price, Utah
 K16NC-D in Fruitland, Utah
 K17HW-D in Green River, Utah
 K17HX-D in Minersville, Utah
 K17IE-D in Navajo Mountain School, Utah
 K17IF-D in Oljeto, Utah
 K17IH-D in Montezuma Creek-Aneth, Utah
 K17JF-D in Bluff, etc., Utah
 K17JH-D in Mexican Hat, etc., Utah
 K17MO-D in Flagstaff, Arizona
 K17MT-D in Garfield, etc., Utah
 K17MY-D in Jackson, Minnesota
 K17NK-D in Cedar City, Utah
 K17NQ-D in Orangeville, Utah
 K18DP-D in Lovelock, Nevada
 K18HR-D in Conchas Dam, New Mexico
 K18HX-D in Hollis, Oklahoma
 K18IU-D in Mayfield, Utah
 K18JE-D in Broadus, Montana
 K18LG-D in Shiprock, New Mexico
 K18LZ-D in Kingman, Arizona
 K18NA-D in Pahrump, Nevada
 K19BU-D in Pahrump, Nevada
 K19DQ-D in Montpelier, Idaho
 K19DY-D in Canon City, Colorado
 K19FX-D in Laramie, Wyoming
 K19GJ-D in Hatch, Utah
 K19HC-D in Hoehne, Colorado
 K19IH-D in Willmar, Minnesota
 K19IM-D in Duckwater, Nevada
 K19IU-D in Battle Mountain, Nevada
 K19LS-D in Walker Lake, Nevada
 K19ME-D in Overton, Nevada
 K20CV-D in Raton, New Mexico
 K20GJ-D in Bloomington, Utah
 K20JQ-D in Wells, Nevada
 K20KG-D in Pasco, Washington
 K20LF-D in Wendover, Utah
 K20MK-D in Roseburg, Oregon
 K20NC-D in Logan, Utah
 K20OF-D in Malad, Idaho
 K21FT-D in Myton, Utah
 K21FU-D in Topock, Arizona
 K21GJ-D in Eureka, Nevada
 K21IC-D in Mount Pleasant, Utah
 K21IF-D in Hanksville, Utah
 K21IN-D in Ridgecrest, etc., California
 K21IT-D in Weatherford, Oklahoma
 K21NN-D in Scipio/Holden, Utah
 K21NO-D in Leamington, Utah
 K21OS-D in Beowawe, Nevada
 K21OV-D in Redstone, Colorado
 K22FN-D in White Oaks, etc., New Mexico
 K22HO-D in Cottage Grove, Oregon
 K22IY-D in Big Piney, Wyoming
 K22JI-D in Huntington, Utah
 K22LE-D in Cedarville, California
 K22MA-D in Elk City, Oklahoma
 K22NG-D in Eureka, Nevada
 K22NP-D in Shiprock, New Mexico
 K22NT-D in Aztec, New Mexico
 K23FC-D in Elko, Nevada
 K23FE-D in Gallup, New Mexico
 K23IC-D in Huntsville, etc., Utah
 K23JU-D in Prosser, Washington
 K23KB-D in Nehpi, Utah
 K23KN-D in Las Animas, Colorado
 K23LX-D in Conrad, Montana
 K23NV-D in Summit County, Utah
 K23OA-D in Kanarraville, Utah
 K23ON-D in Lund & Preston, Nevada
 K23OO-D in Moon Ranch, New Mexico
 K24FE-D in Beaver, etc., Utah
 K24IT-D in Hoquiam, Washington
 K24KU-D in Chinook, Montana
 K24LQ-D in Collbran, Colorado
 K24MD-D in Sayre, Oklahoma
 K24MJ-D in Shoshoni, Wyoming
 K24NQ-D in Golconda, Nevada
 K25EN-D in Gold Beach, Oregon
 K25HO-D in Wolf Point, Montana
 K25IW-D in Golconda, Nevada
 K25LJ-D in Tres Piedras, New Mexico
 K25OK-D in Yoncalla, Oregon
 K25PG-D in Strong City, Oklahoma
 K25PU-D in Mina/Luning, Nevada
 K25QB-D in Lucerne Valley, California
 K25QD-D in Tohatchi, New Mexico
 K26IH-D in Manti, etc., Utah
 K26JY-D in Duckwater, Nevada
 K26LG-D in Phillips County, Montana
 K26OK-D in Lake Havasu City, Arizona
 K27GC-D in Heber/Midway, Utah
 K27GD-D in Park City, Utah
 K27HJ-D in Pierre, South Dakota
 K27JQ-D in Wolf Point, Montana
 K27JV-D in Kanab, Utah
 K27KS-D in Globe/Miami, Arizona
 K27LT-D in Baker, Montana
 K27MF-D in Orovada, Nevada
 K28EU-D in Laughlin, etc., Nevada
 K28GF-D in Cimarron, New Mexico
 K28GV-D in Tres Piedras, New Mexico
 K28IZ-D in Ely, Nevada
 K28KW-D in Sunnyside, Washington
 K28LH-D in Beowawe, Nevada
 K28LL-D in Redwood Falls, Minnesota
 K28LM-D in Eureka, Nevada
 K28NN-D in Wailuku, Hawaii
 K28OB-D in Plentywood, Montana
 K28OE-D in Watertown, South Dakota
 K28OL-D in Loa, etc., Utah
 K29ES-D in Carson City, Nevada
 K29FA-D in Beryl/Modena, etc., Utah
 K29JA-D in Alton, Utah
 K29LM-D in Cottonwood, etc., Arizona
 K29LV-D in Jackson, Minnesota
 K29NK-D in Eureka, Nevada
 K30CN-D in Ely, Nevada
 K30FN-D in St. James, Minnesota
 K30FP-D in Santa Rosa, New Mexico
 K30GG-D in Chloride, Arizona
 K30JD-D in Prescott, Arizona
 K30JM-D in Colorado Springs, Colorado
 K30OW-D in Fishlake Resort, Utah
 K30PB-D in Shurz, Nevada
 K31BM-D in Silver Springs, Nevada
 K31EO-D in Mora, New Mexico
 K31HB-D in Gallina, New Mexico
 K31JR-D in Thoreau, New Mexico
 K31KZ-D in Lakeview, Oregon
 K31MJ-D in Four Buttes, etc., Montana
 K31OQ-D in Grants Pass, Oregon
 K31OR-D in Olivia, Minnesota
 K31OX-D in Ramah, New Mexico
 K31PM-D in Farmington, New Mexico
 K32CA-D in Battle Mountain, Nevada
 K32DY-D in Medford, Oregon
 K32HK-D in Morgan, etc., Utah
 K32HX-D in Duchesne, Utah
 K32IA-D in Manila, etc., Utah
 K32IZ-D in Scofield, Utah
 K32MR-D in Escalante, Utah
 K32NF-D in Spring Glen, Utah
 K33FK-D in Angel Fire, New Mexico
 K33FL-D in Las Vegas, New Mexico
 K33GA-D in Grants/Milan, New Mexico
 K33GC-D in Capulin, etc., New Mexico
 K33GX-D in Springfield, South Dakota
 K33IZ-D in Boulder, Utah
 K33JN-D in Montezuma Creek & Aneth, Utah
 K33KV-D in Lamar, Colorado
 K33NY-D in Roseburg, Oregon
 K33OE-D in Penasco, New Mexico
 K33OJ-D in Garfield, etc., Utah
 K33OM-D in Caineville, Utah
 K33OX-D in Samak, Utah
 K33PF-D in Beaver, etc., Utah
 K33PG-D in Socorro, New Mexico
 K33PH-D in Garrison, etc., Utah
 K33PI-D in Eureka, Nevada
 K33PM-D in Grants Pass, Oregon
 K33PO-D in Clear Creek, Utah
 K33QC-D in Window Rock, Arizona
 K33QD-D in Zuni Pueblo, New Mexico
 K34FQ-D in Roy, New Mexico
 K34GY-D in Culbertson, Montana
 K34HF-D in Cuba, New Mexico
 K34IW-D in Hanna, etc., Utah
 K34JB-D in Vernal, etc., Utah
 K34KJ-D in Crescent City, etc., California
 K34KK-D in Litchfield, California
 K34KQ-D in Fountain Green, Utah
 K34LN-D in Cheyenne Wells, Colorado
 K34ME-D in Overton, Nevada
 K34NV-D in Frost, Minnesota
 K34OA-D in Capitol Reef National, Utah
 K34OD-D in Tropic, etc., Utah
 K34OL-D in Wanship, Utah
 K34OM-D in Henefer, etc., Utah
 K34OW-D in Yreka, California
 K34OX-D in Delta, Oak City, etc., Utah
 K34PB-D in Emery, Utah
 K34PC-D in Green River, Utah
 K34PE-D in Dolan Springs, Arizona
 K34PH-D in Ferron, Utah
 K34QJ-D in Panaca, Nevada
 K35FS-D in Santa Clara, etc., Utah
 K35HD-D in Soda Springs, Idaho
 K35IS-D in Peoa/Oakley, Utah
 K35IX-D in Basalt, Colorado
 K35KM-D in Eureka, Nevada
 K35PE-D in Snowmass Village, Colorado
 K36AI-D in Parowan/Enoch, etc., Utah
 K36BX-D in Coos Bay, Oregon
 K36FQ-D in Wagon Mound, New Mexico
 K36FS-D in Randolph, Utah
 K36HH-D in Susanville, etc., California
 K36OB-D in Verdi, Nevada
 K36OT-D in Coalville, Utah
 K36PB-D in Lewistown, Montana
 K36PP-D in Farmington, etc., New Mexico
 K38JS-D in Antimony, Utah
 K38LC-D in Olivia, Minnesota
 K40LO-D in Fillmore, etc., Utah
 K42AD-D in Blanding/Monticello, Utah
 K47BD-D in Rural Juab County, Utah
 K47MF-D in Orderville, Utah
 K50KF-D in Redwood Falls, Minnesota
 K51KO-D in Joplin, Montana
 KALB-TV in Alexandria, Louisiana
 KATH-LD in Juneau-Douglas, Alaska
 KAUU in Anchorage, Alaska
 KCIB-LD in El Dorado, Arkansas
 KCTV in Kansas City, Missouri
 KDLV-TV in Mitchell, South Dakota
 KENS in San Antonio, Texas
 KEVC-CD in Indio, California
 KFBB-TV in Great Falls, Montana
 KFSM-TV in Fort Smith, Arkansas
 KFYR-TV in Bismarck, North Dakota
 KGMB in Honolulu, Hawaii
 KGWL-TV in Lander, Wyoming
 KGWN-TV in Cheyenne, Wyoming
 KHSD-TV in Lead, South Dakota
 KING-TV in Seattle, Washington
 KLUF-LD in Lufkin, Texas
 KNHL in Hastings, Nebraska
 KNME-TV in Albuquerque, New Mexico
 KNPB in Reno, Nevada
 KOAA-TV in Pueblo, Colorado
 KOBI in Medford, Oregon
 KOCO-TV in Oklahoma City, Oklahoma
 KPHO-TV in Phoenix, Arizona
 KPIX-TV in San Francisco, California
 KPWC-LD in Tillamook, Oregon
 KRDH-LD in Cripple Creek, etc., Colorado
 KREX-TV in Grand Junction, Colorado
 KRGV-TV in Weslaco, Texas
 KSDK in St. Louis, Missouri
 KSL-TV in Salt Lake City, Utah
 KSTC-TV in Minneapolis, Minnesota
 KSTP-TV in St. Paul, Minnesota
 KSXC-LD in South Sioux City, Nebraska
 KTDJ-LD in Dayton, Texas
 KTLA in Los Angeles, California
 KTTZ-TV in Lubbock, Texas
 KVVU-TV in Henderson, Nevada
 KXAS-TV in Fort Worth, Texas
 KXGN-TV in Glendive, Montana
 KYES-LD in Anchorage, Alaska
 KYEX-LD in Juneau, Alaska
 W05BV-D in Starkville, Mississippi
 W05CO-D in Sarasota, Florida
 W05CY-D in Mayaguez, Puerto Rico
 W05DA-D in Fajardo, Puerto Rico
 W05DB-D in Ponce, Puerto Rico
 W09DB-D in Williamsport, Pennsylvania
 W10BG-D in Mayaguez, Puerto Rico
 W20DW-D in Clarksdale, Mississippi
 W24ES-D in Moorefield, West Virginia
 W29EE-D in San Lorenzo, Puerto Rico
 WABI-TV in Bangor, Maine
 WAGA-TV in Atlanta, Georgia
 WANF-LD in Jackson, Tennessee
 WBKP in Calumet, Michigan
 WCSC-TV in Charleston, South Carolina
 WCVB-TV in Boston, Massachusetts
 WCYB-TV in Bristol, Virginia
 WDDY-LD in Jackson, Tennessee
 WDTO-LD in Orlando, Florida
 WDTV in Weston, West Virginia
 WEWS-TV in Cleveland, Ohio
 WFRV-TV in Green Bay, Wisconsin
 WKRG-TV in Mobile, Alabama
 WLWT in Cincinnati, Ohio
 WMAQ-TV in Chicago, Illinois
 WMBE-LD in Myrtle Beach, South Carolina
 WMC-TV in Memphis, Tennessee
 WNEM-TV in Bay City, Michigan
 WNYW in New York, New York
 WOI-DT in Ames, Iowa
 WORA-TV in Mayaguez, Puerto Rico
 WPTV-TV in West Palm Beach, Florida
 WPTZ in Plattsburgh, New York
 WRAL-TV in Raleigh, North Carolina
 WTTG in Washington, D.C.
 WTVF in Nashville, Tennessee
 WTVH in Syracuse, New York
 WUFT in Gainesville, Florida
 WZDS-LD in Evansville, Indiana
 WZPJ-LD in Bennington, Vermont

The following television stations, which are no longer licensed, formerly operated on virtual channel 5 in the United States:
 K05MY-D in Bakersfield, California
 K09XO-D in Homer, Alaska
 K23KV-D in Austin, Nevada
 K24CS-D in Granite Falls, Minnesota
 K32HO-D in Fruitland, Utah
 K33BN in Taos, New Mexico
 K33PY-D in Round Mountain, Nevada
 K36OK-D in Granite Falls, Minnesota
 K40GZ-D in Preston, Idaho
 K46FB-D in Austin, Nevada
 K49IL-D in Tecolote, New Mexico
 K49KF-D in Los Alamos/Espanola, New Mexico
 KCEM-LD in Chelan Butte, Washington
 W30DW-D in Tifton, Georgia
 WXFL-LD in Florence, etc., Alabama

References

05 virtual